Cezary Skubiszewski is a Polish-born Australian film and television composer. He composed film scores for Red Dog, Two Hands, The Sapphires, and TV series Picnic at Hanging Rock.

Career
Skubiszewski first made his mark composing the score for Jerzy Domaradzki's Lilian's Story. He has worked with many Australian directors, composing scores for Gregor Jordan's Two Hands, Tony MacNamara's The Rage in Placid Lake and Gillian Armstrong's Death Defying Acts. Skubiszewski won awards from the Australian Film Institute (AFI) for Bootmen and La Spagnola.

Skubiszewski also co-composed the music to the Australian Army's "Rise" recruiting campaign, Carlton Draught's 'Big Ad' and 'VB Symphony'.

Personal life
He is the father of actress, film director/writer Viva Bianca and composer/music producer Jan Skubiszewski.

Awards and nominations

ARIA Music Awards

! 
|-
| 1996
| Lilian's Story
|rowspan="5" |  Best Original Soundtrack, Cast or Show Album
| 
|rowspan="5" | 
|-
| 1998
| The Sound of One Hand Clapping
| 
|-
| 2003
| After the Deluge (Original Television Mini-series Soundtrack)
| 
|-
| 2008
| Night
| 
|-
| 2017
| Red Dog: True Blue (original soundtrack)
| 
|-

Australasian Performing Rights Association
 1998 - Best Film Score for The Sound of One Hand Clapping - nom
 1999 - Best Film Score for Two Hands (with Jan Skubiszewski) - won

Australian Film Critics Association Awards
 2013 - Best Music Score The Sapphire - Won
 2015- Best Original Music Score in Television The Broken Shore -  Nominated

2014	Nominated
AACTA Award	 Best Sound in a Documentary
Once My Mother (2014) 
Shared with:
Michael Gissing 
Mark Keating 
2012	Nominated
AACTA Award	 Best Original Music Score
Red Dog (2011) 
2010	Nominated
AFI Award	 Best Original Music Score
Beneath Hill 60 (2010) 
Best Original Music Score
Bran Nue Dae (2009) 
Shared with:
Jimmy Chi 
Patrick Duttoo Bin Amat 
Garry Gower 
Michael Manolis Mavromatis 
Stephen Pigram 
2009	Nominated
AFI Award	 Best Sound in a Documentary
Lionel (2008) 
Shared with:
Nick Batterham 
Keith Thomas 
2006	Nominated
AFI Award	 Best Original Music Score
The Book of Revelation (2006) 
2003	Nominated
Open Craft Award	 Television
After the Deluge (2003) 
For original music.
2001	Won
AFI Award	 Best Original Music Score
La Spagnola (2001) 
2000	Won
AFI Award	 Best Original Music Score
Bootmen (2000) 
1999	Nominated
AFI Award	 Best Original Music Score
Two Hands (1999) 
1996	Nominated
AFI Award	 Best Original Music Score
Lilian's Story (1996)

Australian Guild of Screen Composers
 1999	Won
Australian Screen Music Award	 Best Original Music for a Feature Film
Two Hands (1999) 
 Nominated
Australian Screen Music Award	 Best Original Music for a Feature Film
Strange Fits of Passion (1999)

Film Critics Circle of Australia Awards

2013	Won
FCCA Award	 Best Music Score
The Sapphires (2012) 
2012	Nominated
FCCA Award	 Best Music Score
Red Dog (2011) 
2011	Won
FCCA Award	 Best Music Score
Bran Nue Dae (2009) 
Nominated
FCCA Award	 Best Music Score
Beneath Hill 60 (2010) 
2009	Nominated
FCCA Award	 Best Music Score
Death Defying Acts (2007) 
2006	Won
FCCA Award	 Best Music Score
The Book of Revelation (2006) 
2002	Nominated
FCCA Award	 Best Music Score
La Spagnola (2001) 
2001	Won
FCCA Award	 Best Music Score
Bootmen (2000) 
Tied with Edmund Choi for Dish, The (2000)__.
2000	Nominated
FCCA Award	 Best Music Score
Two Hands (1999)

IF Awards
 2011	Won
IF Award Best Music
Red Dog 
 2010	Nominated
IF Award Best Music
Bran Nue Dae

International Film Music Critics Award (IFMCA)
2008	Nominated
IFMCA Award	 Best Original Score for a Documentary
Night (2008)

APRA-AGSC Awards
The annual Screen Music Awards are presented by Australasian Performing Right Association (APRA) and Australian Guild of Screen Composers (AGSC) for television and film scores and soundtracks.

|-
|rowspan="4"| 2003 || rowspan="3"| After the Deluge (Cezary Skubiszewski) || Best Soundtrack Album || 
|-
| Best Television Theme || 
|-
| Best Music for a Mini-Series or Telemovie || 
|-
| Black and White (Cezary Skubiszewski) || Best Feature Film Score || 
|-
| 2005 || The Brush-Off (Cezary Skubiszewski) || Best Music for a Mini-Series or Telemovie || 
|-
| 2006 || The Society Murders (Cezary Skubiszewski) || Best Music for a Mini-Series or Telemovie || 
|-
|rowspan="2"| 2007 || rowspan="2"| The Book of Revelation (Cezary Skubiszewski) || Feature Film Score of the Year || 
|-
| Best Soundtrack Album || 
|-
|rowspan="2"| 2008 || Night (Cezary Skubiszewski) || Best Music for a Documentary || 
|-
| "Free Falling 2" (Cezary Skubiszewski, Jan Skubiszewski, Andy Baldwin, Clairanne Browne, Jules Pascoe) – Night || Best Original Song Composed for the Screen || 
|-
|rowspan="2"| 2009 || Death Defying Acts (Cezary Skubiszewski) || Best Soundtrack Album || 
|-
| Carla Cametti PD (Cezary Skubiszewski, Jan Skubiszewski) || Best Television Theme || 
|-
| 2010 || Beneath Hill 60 (Cezary Skubiszewski) || Best Feature Film Score || 
|-
| 2013 || The Mystery of a Hansom Cab (Cezary Skubiszewski) || Best Music for a Mini-Series or Telemovie || 
|-
| rowspan="3"| 2014 || Once My Mother (Cezary Skubiszewski) || Best Music for a Documentary || 
|-
| Serangoon Road – "Episode 6" (Cezary Skubiszewski, Jan Skubiszewski) || Best Music for a Television Series or Serial || 
|-
| The Broken Shore (Cezary Skubiszewski) || Best Soundtrack Album ||

Selected discography

1981 Home at Last (symphony)
1991 Soundescape (music theatre)
1994 Sky Trackers (TV)
1995 Lilian's Story (film)
1996 Hurah a.k.a. Heaven Sent (film)
1998 The Sound of One Hand Clapping (film)
1999 Two Hands (film)
1999 Witch Hunt (TV film)
2000 Bootmen (film)
2000 The Wog Boy
2001 La Spagnola
2002 Black and White (film)
2003 After the Deluge (TV)
2003 The Rage in Placid Lake
2004 The Brush-Off (TV)
2005 Hating Alison Ashley (film)
2006 The Book of Revelation (film)
2006 The Society Murders (TV)
2007  Death Defying Acts (film)
2008  Night (film)
2008 (Lionel) (film)
2009 Carla Cametti PD (TV)
2009 Blessed (film)
2009 Bran Nue Dae (film)
2010 Beneath Hill 60 (film)
2010 Wolf Blass television advertisements
2011 Red Dog (film)
2012 The Sapphires (film)
2015 Oddball (film)
2016 Red Dog: True Blue (film)
2018 Tiger'' (film)

References

External links
 

1948 births
APRA Award winners
Polish composers
Polish film score composers
Living people
Male film score composers
Polish emigrants to Australia